Jan Baaijens (born 10 March 1957, Zaandam) is a Dutch sprint canoer who competed in the early 1980s. At the 1980 Summer Olympics in Moscow, he was eliminated in the semifinals of the K-1 500 m, K-1 1000 m, and K-4 1000 m events.

References
Sports-Reference.com profile

1957 births
Living people
Canoeists at the 1980 Summer Olympics
Dutch male canoeists
Olympic canoeists of the Netherlands
Sportspeople from Zaanstad
20th-century Dutch people
21st-century Dutch people